Iconic is the second extended play by Swedish duo Icona Pop. It was released on 1 August 2012 through TEN Music Group. The EP was preceded by the lead single "I Love It", which scored an international hit, peaking number one in the United Kingdom and seven in the United States.

Track listing

Charts

Weekly charts

Year-end charts

Release history

References

2012 EPs
Big Beat Records (American record label) albums
TEN Music Group albums
Icona Pop albums
Big Beat Records (American record label) EPs